Miss Teen America is an American beauty contest that serves as a training ground for many young American girls, many of whom go on to win other titles. Winners have had ongoing columns in Supermodels Unlimited and Pageantry magazines. Miss Teen America is not associated with the Miss America Organization nor should it be confused with Miss Teen USA. In July 2010, Nikki Clark, President of Miss Teen America, Inc. became the new Executive Director of Miss Teen America. Miss Teen America 2020 has yet to be crowned.

Winners

Notable national contestants
Marla Prete (Connecticut - 1997) - Miss Connecticut 2003
Renelle Richardson (Connecticut - 1999) - Miss Connecticut 2000
Tori Carter (Colorado & 4th RU at Nationals - 2001, Rocky Mountain State & 1st RU at Nationals - 2002) - Miss Colorado Teen USA 2004
Christina Ellington (Connecticut - 2001 & 1st RU at Nationals) - Miss New York 2004 & Top 10 at Miss America 2005
Candace Cragg (Florida - 2001 & 2nd RU at Nationals) - Miss Florida 2005 (resigned)
Dana Daunis (Connecticut - 2002, Nutmeg State & Top 10 at Nationals - 2003) - Miss Connecticut 2007 & Preliminary Talent Winner at Miss America 2008
Raquel Beezley (Southern California - 2002) - Miss California USA 2008 & Top 15 at Miss USA 2008
Caressa Cameron (Commonwealth of Virginia - 2003 & 3rd RU at Nationals, Nation's Capitol - 2005) - Miss Virginia 2009 & Miss America 2010
Jennifer Brooks (Connecticut - 2003 & Top 10 at Nationals) - Miss Connecticut Teen USA 2005
Alla Ilushka (Minnesota - 2003) - Miss Minnesota Teen USA 2002, Top 10 at Miss Teen USA 2002, & Miss Minnesota USA 2007
Hope Wiseman (Chesapeake - 2006 & Top 10 at Nationals) - Miss District of Columbia's Outstanding Teen 2009
Savannah Schechter (New Jersey - 2008 & 1st RU at Nationals) - Miss New Jersey Teen USA 2011
Brittany Dawn Brannon (Arizona - 2007 & Miss Teen America 2007) - Miss Arizona USA 2011
Kaitlyn Tarpey (New York - 2008 & Miss Teen America 2008/09) - Miss Connecticut 2013
Ciana Pelekai (Hawaii - 2017 Miss Teen America) - America's Got Talent Season 4 and Season 8 Finalist

References

Teen America
1995 establishments in the United States
American awards
Beauty pageants for youth